Beryl Frances Vertue  (née Johnson; 8 April 1931 – 12 February 2022) was an English television producer, media executive, and agent. She was founder and chairman of the independent television production company Hartswood Films.

Early life and career
Vertue was born in Croydon, Surrey on 8 April 1931. She attended Mitcham county school, and left at 15 to take a typing course. She began her working life as a secretary in a shipping firm, and remained here for six years until she contracted tuberculosis.  She was sent to a sanatorium on the Isle of Wight. Shortly after her recovery, a school friend, Alan Simpson, invited her to join Associated London Scripts (ALS) as a secretary and she began working with the writers' cooperative in 1955.  She wasn't keen to start work here, as she dreaded the hour-long commute. She asked for what she thought would be a prohibitive sub of ten pounds a week, and to her horror they agreed.  

She started by typing up Spike Milligan's scripts for the Goon Show. Later she was tasked with phoning the BBC regarding contracts for Alan Simpson, and his colleague Ray Galton. Not only was it a successful conversation, she also managed to negotiate doubling their income for Hancock's Half Hour. From this she became their chief negotiator and agent, almost by accident, representing comedy writers Spike Milligan, Eric Sykes, Johnny Speight, Ray Galton and Alan Simpson, and Terry Nation (for whom she negotiated to keep partial rights to his Dalek creation for Doctor Who). She also represented comedians Tony Hancock (until 1961) and Frankie Howerd.

Frankie Howerd's career was in eclipse, and he was considering changing occupation by running a pub. She managed to dissuade him, and got him a booking at the Blue Angel, a London nightclub which revived his career.

Later career
In 1967, Vertue was invited by Robert Stigwood to join his company, which had absorbed ALS, and became deputy chairman. Sykes and Milligan ended their professional relationship with Vertue at this change, though she continued to represent Galton, Simpson and Howerd. 

Working under the new arrangement, she became an executive producer for the newly-created Associated London Films. The first production was The Plank (1967), Sykes' wordless silent film. In this role, Vertue was involved in film spin-offs of television comedies of writers with whom she had previously worked. Meanwhile, she sold British television formats to the United States. These successes included Steptoe and Son, which became Sanford and Son in the U.S., and Till Death Us Do Part, which was turned into All in the Family. In 1975, she was a co-executive producer of the cinema version of The Who's rock opera Tommy, directed by Ken Russell and starring Roger Daltrey. The film company lasted for eight years after which she continued with the Robert Stigwood Organisation as executive vice-president producing programmes for American television.

Stigwood once sent her to negotiate with Ike Turner in order to allow Tina Turner to appear in the 1975 musical film, Tommy. She promised they would take good care of Tina, and then thanked him before he'd ever really consented. Her powers of persuasion were so good that he agreed. 

Vertue formed Hartswood Films in 1979. It has produced many comedies including Men Behaving Badly, Is It Legal?, and Coupling, the latter written by her son-in-law Steven Moffat. She also served as executive producer of their dramatic series Sherlock, which Moffat also co-created. Her daughter, Sue Vertue, produced the series.

Personal life
Vertue married her childhood sweetheart Clem Vertue in 1951. They divorced amicably in 1984 as the relationship could not survive her many work-related absences. The couple had two daughters: Sue and Debbie. Sue became a television producer and married writer/producer Steven Moffat, of Doctor Who and Sherlock fame. Debbie became operations director at Hartswood.

Vertue died on 12 February 2022, at the age of 90.

Honours and awards
Vertue was appointed Officer of the Order of the British Empire (OBE) in the 2000 New Year Honours for services to television and Commander of the Order of the British Empire (CBE) in the 2016 New Year Honours for services to television drama. In 2004, she received the British Academy Television Awards (BAFTA) Alan Clarke Award for Outstanding Creative Contribution to Television.

Vertue was conferred a Lifetime Achievement Award at the Royal Television Society Programme Awards on 20 March 2012.  Ten days later, she was presented with the Harvey Lee Award for Outstanding Contribution to Broadcasting at the BPG TV and Radio Awards.

On 25 January 2013, Vertue was the guest on BBC Radio 4's Desert Island Discs. Her musical choices were Elton John's "Pinball Wizard", Giacomo Puccini's "Nessun Dorma", Glenn Miller's "Moonlight Serenade", the Bee Gees's "Morning of my Life", the Broadway cast of A Chorus Line performing "Finale", Elaine Paige's "Don't Cry for Me Argentina" from Evita, the London Session Orchestra performance of "SHERlocked" from the Sherlock TV series soundtrack, and Louis Armstrong's performance of "What a Wonderful World".

Filmography

 The Spy with a Cold Nose (1966) – production associate
 The Plank (1967) – executive producer
 Till Death Us Do Part (1968) – executive producer
 Up Pompeii (1971) – executive producer
 Steptoe and Son (1972) – executive producer
 Up the Chastity Belt (1972) – executive producer
 Up the Front (1972) – executive producer
 The Alf Garnett Saga (1972) – executive producer
 And No One Could Save Her (1973; TV movie) – executive producer
 The House in Nightmare Park (1973) – executive producer
 Steptoe and Son Ride Again (1973) – executive producer
 Mousey (1974; TV movie) – executive producer
 Tommy (1975) – executive producer
 Beacon Hill (1975; TV series) – executive producer
 The Entertainer (1975; TV movie) – executive producer
 Almost Anything Goes (1975–76; TV series) – executive producer
 Sparkle (1976) – executive producer
 The Prime of Miss Jean Brodie (1978; TV series) – executive producer
 Charleston (1979; TV movie) – executive producer
 Parole (1982; TV movie) – producer
 Codename: Kyril (1988; TV miniseries) – producer
 Men Behaving Badly (1992–98) – producer
 A Woman's Guide to Adultery (1993; TV series) – producer
 The English Wife (1995; TV movie) – producer
 My Good Friend (1995–96; TV series) – producer
 Is It Legal? (1995–98; TV series) – producer
 Men Behaving Badly (1996–97; TV series) – executive consultant
 Officers and Gentlemen (1997; documentary) – producer
 The Red Baron (1998; documentary) – producer
 In Love with Elizabeth (1998; documentary) – producer
 Wonderful You (1999; TV miniseries) – producer
 Border Cafe (2000; TV miniseries) – executive producer
 Coupling (2000–2004; TV series) – executive producer
 The War Behind the Wire (2000; TV series; documentary) – producer
 The Savages (2001; TV series) – executive producer
 The Welsh Great Escape (2003; TV movie) – producer
 Carrie & Barry (2004–05; TV series) – executive producer
 Supernova (2005–06; TV Series) – executive producer
 After Thomas (2006; TV movie) – executive producer
 The Lift (2007; TV movie) – executive producer
 Biffovision (2007; TV movie) – executive producer
 Jekyll (2007; miniseries) – executive producer
 The Cup (2008; TV series) – executive producer
 What's Virgin Mean? (2008) – executive producer
 Love at First Sight (2010) – executive producer
 Sherlock (2010–17; TV series) – executive producer
 Me and Mrs Jones (2012; TV series) – executive producer
 The Guilty (2013; miniseries) – executive producer
 Edge of Heaven (2014; TV series) – executive producer
 Lady Chatterley's Lover (2015; TV movie) – executive producer

References

External links
 
 Debrett’s People of Today : Ms Beryl Vertue, OBE

1931 births
2022 deaths
BBC television producers
British women television producers
Commanders of the Order of the British Empire
People from Croydon
English company founders
WFTV Award winners